Valiyaveetil Diju (born 4 January 1981), also known as V. Diju, is an Indian badminton player from Kozhikode, Kerala. He clinched six National Championships title, once in the men's doubles and five times in the mixed doubles. He represented India in the 2012 London Olympics, became the first Indian player to participate at the Olympics in the mixed doubles alongside Jwala Gutta. He is the winner of Arjuna Award 2014, given by the Ministry of Youth Affairs and Sports, government of India to recognize his outstanding achievement in National sports. He is also the winner of G. V. Raja awards, which is the highest government-level recognition for sports persons in Kerala. He is winner of Jimmy George award 2014. He is also winner of Vivekanandha sports excellence award 2014. He won the Youth excellence award also in 2014.He is the only mixed doubles player from India to reach top 10 in the world badminton ranking(BWF) .His highest ranking is number 6th in world ranking.

Career 
Diju started his International career by representing India for Asian junior badminton championship held at Hong Kong in 1997. In 2002, he and Sanave Thomas won the men's doubles title at the Indian National Championships by defeating Jaseel P. Ismail and Jaison Xavier in four games. He won the 2008 Bitburger Open in Germany along with Jwala Gutta. It was India's first mixed-doubles Grand Prix win. Diju is a five-time National mixed-doubles champion. In 2006, he won the mixed team bronze medal in Commonwealth Games at Melbourne. Diju-Gutta pair was runner-up at Indian Open held at Hyderabad in 2009. They lost to Indonesian Flandy Limpele and Vita Marissa in the final.

 2009 World Badminton Championship
In August 2009, the Diju-Gutta mixed doubles pair became the first Indians to enter the quarterfinals of World Championship. The Championships was held at Hyderabad, India. The duo, seeded 8th, got a bye in the first round followed by a walkover in the second. In the third round they defeated 12th seed polish pair of Robert Mateusiak and Nadieżda Kostiuczyk 21–11, 22–20 in a 31-minute clash. In the quarter-final they went down to defending champions and second seeds Nova Widianto and Liliyana Natsir of Indonesia. The Indian pair was beaten 16–21, 14–21 in 27 minutes.

 Chinese Taipei Grand Prix
On 30 August 2009, Diju partnering Jwala Gutta became the first Indian badminton mixed doubles pair to win a Grand Prix Gold title. They defeated Indonesia's Hendra Aprida Gunawan and Vita Marissa 24–22, 21–18 in the Chinese Taipei Open final. In the quarter-final, the world No. 7 pair and third seed in the tournament, defeated South Korean pair Shin Baek-cheol and Yoo Hyun-Young and in the semi-final Diju and Gutta prevailed over Malaysians Goh Liu Ying and Chan Peng Soon 21–11, 17–21, 24–22.

 2009 World Super Series Masters
In December 2009, Diju and his doubles partner Gutta reached the World Superseries Masters final in Johor Bahru, Malaysia. They beat Robert Mateusiak and Nadieżda Kostiuczyk of Poland in straight-games 21–19, 21–11. In the final the Indian pair went down to World Championship bronze medalists Joachim Fischer Nielsen and Christinna Pedersen 14–21, 18–21.

 2010 Delhi Commonwealth Games
In 2010, Diju won the silver medal in Commonwealth Games in the mixed team event. He participated at the Asian Games in Guangzhou. Diju and Gutta pair reached the quarter-finals of the World Championships for the second consecutive year beaten by Koreans Ko Sung-hyun and Ha Jung-eun 21–16, 21–19 having beaten the English pair of Chris Adcock and Gabrielle White and Malaysians Goh Liu Ying and Chan Peng Soon in straight games and overcoming Chayut Triyachart and Yao Lei from Singapore in the pre-quarters in three games. The pair also won the 2010 India Open Grand Prix Gold for their second Grand Prix Gold title beating Triyachart and Lei in three games.

 2011 Ranchi National Games winner
In 2011, Diju and Gutta reached the quarter-finals or better at three tournaments including two Super Series Premieres events at Denmark Open and China Masters where they reached the semi-finals, their first since 2009. They beat second seeded Chinese pair of Tao Jiaming and Tian Qing in the first round 5–21, 21–14, 21–18.

 2012 London Olympics
Diju started his Olympic campaign pairing Jwala Gutta in mixed doubles. However they lost their opening match 16–21, 12–21 in just 25 minutes at the Wembley Arena in London.

 G.V Raja Award
Government of Kerala announced him as the recipient of G.V. Raja awards for 2012–13.

Achievements

South Asian Games

BWF Superseries Finals

BWF Grand Prix 
The BWF Grand Prix has two levels, the BWF Grand Prix and Grand Prix Gold. It is a series of badminton tournaments sanctioned by the Badminton World Federation (BWF) since 2007. The World Badminton Grand Prix sanctioned by International Badminton Federation (IBF) since 1983.

 BWF Grand Prix Gold tournament
 BWF & IBF Grand Prix tournament

IBF International 

  BWF International Challenge tournament
  BWF International Series tournament
  BWF Future Series tournament

Personal life 
Diju was born at Ramanattukara, in the Calicut district to Karunakaran and Lalitha on 4 January 1981. He did his schooling in Govt. Model Boys School, Thrissur. He completed his graduation from Farook College, Calicut. Diju is currently working as Chief Manager in ONGC, Chennai. He is married to Dr. Soumya on 16 September 2012. Diju and Soumya have a son Ivaan, who born 16 February 2017. Diju has an elder brother Dinu.

References

External links

 
 We stuck to our natural game: Exclusive interview to espnstar.com
 

1981 births
Living people
People from Kozhikode district
Racket sportspeople from Kerala
Malayali people
Indian male badminton players
Indian national badminton champions
Badminton players at the 2012 Summer Olympics
Olympic badminton players of India
Badminton players at the 2006 Asian Games
Badminton players at the 2010 Asian Games
Asian Games competitors for India
Badminton players at the 2006 Commonwealth Games
Badminton players at the 2010 Commonwealth Games
Commonwealth Games silver medallists for India
Commonwealth Games bronze medallists for India
Commonwealth Games medallists in badminton
South Asian Games gold medalists for India
South Asian Games silver medalists for India
Recipients of the Arjuna Award
South Asian Games medalists in badminton
Medallists at the 2006 Commonwealth Games
Medallists at the 2010 Commonwealth Games